Techmarscincus is a genus of skink, a lizard in the family Scincidae. The genus is endemic to Australia, and is monotypic, containing the sole species Techmarscincus jigurru.

Techmarscincus jigurru, commonly known as the Bartle Frere skink, is a species of rare and endangered lizard first discovered in 1981. It was described and named in 1984 by the late Australian herpetologist Jeanette Covacevich.

Geographic range
The Bartle Frere skink is endemic to Queensland, Australia.

Description
T. jigurru has a rainbow sheen color. Its body is long and flat, with short limbs and a long tail.

Behaviour
The Bartle Frere skink is agile and energetic. It is only seen out and basking during the day. It spends most of its time on top of exposed granite boulders.  A night, it retreats into cracks in the exposed granite. The Bartle Frere skink tolerates juveniles in the same area, as most skinks do not.

Habitat
The Bartle Frere skink is usually found above  on the slopes of Queensland's highest mountains (e.g., Mount Bartle Frere). The climate is of a temperate rain forest.

Reproduction
T. jigurru is oviparous.

References

External links
Techmarscincus jigurru image, PBase.
Techmarscincus jigurru Bartle Frere Skink, Map.

Further reading
Covacevich J (1984). "A biogeographically significant new species of Leiolopisma (Scincidae) from north eastern Queensland". Memoirs of the Queensland Museum 21 (2): 401-411. (Leiolopisma jigurru, new species).
Wells RW, Wellington CR (1985). "A classification of the Amphibia and Reptilia of Australia". Australian J. Herpetol., Supplemental Series 1: 1-61. (Techmarscincus jigurru, new combination).

Skinks of Australia
Monotypic lizard genera
Taxa named by Richard Walter Wells
Taxa named by Cliff Ross Wellington